The 1961 East Fife by-election was a by-election held for the House of Commons constituency of East Fife in Scotland on 9 November 1961. It was won by the Unionist candidate Sir John Gilmour with a majority of 7,066 votes.

Vacancy 
The seat had become vacant when the sitting National Liberal Member of Parliament (MP), Sir James Henderson-Stewart had died aged 63 on 3 September 1961. He had held the seat since a by-election in 1933. The result at the previous election was as follows;

Candidates 
The Unionist candidate was 49-year-old Sir John Gilmour, an Eton and Cambridge-educated baronet who was a local farmer and landowner, and a decorated war hero. His father, also named John, had been an MP for thirty years, serving as a Cabinet minister during the 1920s and 1930s; including a period as Home Secretary. Gilmour was a reluctant by-election candidate; he had stood unsuccessfully at the 1945 general election in Clackmannan and Eastern Stirlingshire, but preferred local politics and had been a member of Fife County Council since 1955. However, he was pressured to stand by the constituency association which feared the imposition of an unpopular Conservative candidate.

The Labour Party candidate was John Smith, a 23-year-old law student at the University of Glasgow, who would later become Shadow Chancellor in 1987 and more importantly, Leader of the Labour Party in 1992.

The Liberal Party candidate was 30-year-old Donald Leach. He contested Edinburgh West at the 1959 general election. He was the Head of Department of Mathematics at Napier College of Science and Technology, and was educated at John Ruskin Grammar School and Croydon Polytechnic.

Result 
Gilmour was elected with a reduced but still large majority, with nearly 50% of the votes. 

Gilmour was re-elected at the 1964 general election, with an increased majority over Smith, and held the seat until he stepped down at the 1979 general election. Smith would eventually be elected as Leader of the Labour Party 31 years later, after the resignation of Neil Kinnock.

See also
East Fife (UK Parliament constituency)
Fife
1933 East Fife by-election
List of United Kingdom by-elections (1950–1979)

Notes

References 
 British Parliamentary by-elections: East Fife 1961
 1959 general election results at Richard Kimber's political science resources
 1955 general election results at Richard Kimber's political science resources

By-elections to the Parliament of the United Kingdom in Scottish constituencies
1961 elections in the United Kingdom
1961 in Scotland
1960s elections in Scotland
20th century in Fife
History of Fife
Politics of Fife